Christopher Lebenzon is an American film editor with more than 36 film credits dating from 1976. The films he has edited have grossed over 10 billion dollars worldwide.

He has been nominated for the Academy Award for Best Film Editing for the films Top Gun (1986) and Crimson Tide (1995). He is a member of the American Cinema Editors (A.C.E) and has been nominated six times having won The Eddie Award for his work on Sweeney Todd: The Demon Barber of Fleet Street (2007) and Alice in Wonderland (2010). He is noted particularly for working with directors Michael Bay, Tony Scott and has worked with Tim Burton for over 25 years.

In addition to editing, he has also served as an executive producer on Alice in Wonderland (2010) and Dark Shadows (2012).

Filmography (as editor)

References

External links

American Cinema Editors
American film editors
Living people
Year of birth missing (living people)